Antoine "Tony" Issa OAM (born 14 August 1955 in Lebanon), an Australian politician, was a member of the New South Wales Legislative Assembly representing Granville for the Liberal Party from 2011 until the 2015 election when he lost the seat to Labor's Julia Finn.

Early years and background
Issa migrated to Australia with his father in 1973, as one of seven children of Lebanese Maronite Catholic background. Issa has extensive community involvement including:
 President, Bkerkacha Charitable Association (1989)
 Treasurer, Granville Multicultural Centre (1984–1987)
 President, Granville Multicultural Centre (1987–1991)
 board member, Australian Lebanese Welfare Group (2004–2008)
 School Representative, Catholic Diocesan Parramatta Regional Council (ca. 1992)
 Member, Bicentenary Committee (1988)
 Member, Western Sydney Assistant Services Ranking Committee
 board member, Western Sydney Regional Organisation of Councils (WSROC)
 Chairman, Sister City Organisation
 Representative, Finance Complaint Services Board
 committee member, Our Lady of Lebanon Church, Sydney

Local government career
Elected to Parramatta City Council in 1988, Issa served as an independent councillor until 1998 and then as a Liberal Party Councillor from 1998 to the present.

Issa was elected as deputy mayor from 2000 to 2001 and became the first Liberal Party lord mayor in New South Wales, serving between 2008 and 2009.

State political career
In 1994, he contested unsuccessfully as an independent in the Parramatta by-election.

In 2011, Issa contested the normally safe Labor seat of Granville in the Sydney's western suburbs. Running against the incumbent and high-profile sitting member and Minister, David Borger.

Issa was elected with a swing of 13.1 points and won the seat with 52.7 per cent of the two-party vote.

Honours
Issa was awarded the Medal of the Order of Australia in 1995 for service to local government and to the Lebanese community.

Issa was awarded the Order of Local Government for more than 20 years service as a Councillor on Parramatta City Council.

References

 

Liberal Party of Australia members of the Parliament of New South Wales
Members of the New South Wales Legislative Assembly
Lebanese emigrants to Australia
Living people
1955 births
21st-century Australian politicians
Mayors and Lord Mayors of Parramatta
Recipients of the Medal of the Order of Australia